The Turkish Ambassador to Austria has their residence in Vienna.

History 
On September 2, 1686 in the Battle of Buda (1686) troops of the Holy League (1684) conquered the fortress of Buda.  On September 27, 1688 Jacques Henri de Durfort de Duras besieged the fortress of Philippsburg with 30,000 men and opened the Nine Years' War for Louis XIV of France. Leopold I, Holy Roman Emperor was now in a two-front war. :fr:Pierre-Antoine de Châteauneuf persuaded Suleiman II to continue the war against Leopold I, Holy Roman Emperor. In June 1689 it was decided to set the armistice negotiations with Zülfikar as head of Chancery and  Alexander Mavrocordatos as Dragoman.
From November 16, 1698 to January 26, 1699 Rami Mehmed Pasha as Reis ül-Küttab and Alexander Mavrocordatos as Dragoman negotiated the Treaty of Karlowitz for the Ottoman Empire.

List of Turkish chiefs of mission to Austria

References 

 
Turkey
Austria

tr:Şablon:Türkiye'nin Avusturya büyükelçileri